Alanson Tilman Lincoln (October 23, 1858 – January 28, 1925) was an American Republican politician who served as a member of the Virginia Senate. He also represented Smythe and Bland Counties at the Virginia Constitutional Convention of 1902.

He was defeated for reelection to the Senate in 1911 by Democrat David C. Cummings Jr., after which he was elected to a term in the Virginia House of Delegates.

References

External links

 
 

1858 births
1925 deaths
Republican Party Virginia state senators
Republican Party members of the Virginia House of Delegates
20th-century American politicians
People from Smyth County, Virginia